Svetlana Kuznetsova and Samantha Stosur were the defending champions, but chose not to participate this year. 
Martina Hingis and Flavia Pennetta won the title, defeating Caroline Garcia and Arantxa Parra Santonja in the final, 6–3, 7–5.

Seeds

Draw

Draw

References
 Main Draw

2014 Women's Doubles
Kremlin Cup – Doubles